The Menabrea II government of Italy held office from 5 January 1868 until 13 May 1869, a total of 494 days, or 1 year, 4 months and 8 days.

Government parties
The government was composed by the following parties:

Composition

References

Italian governments
1868 establishments in Italy